Established in 1982, Immaculate Conception Apostolic School (ICAS) was a private Roman Catholic boarding school for boys in grades seven through twelve. It was located within the Diocese of Manchester and run by the Legionaries of Christ, a religious congregation of the Roman Catholic Church. The school buildings still stand overlooking Lake Winnipesaukee in the central New Hampshire town of Center Harbor. It served approximately 130 students at its heyday. It closed permanently in June 2015.

Background
The school was formerly a minor seminary and novitiate of the Missionaries of La Salette. The property was purchased by the Legionaries of Christ in 1982, and since that time until its closing in 2015, the school expanded and continued in its purpose to provide religious and academic instruction for boys. While some students continued on to a seminary after graduation, many pursued college or university degrees. Students came from throughout the United States and from several countries around the world including Canada, Mexico, Australia, New Zealand, France, Germany, South Korea, and South Africa.

Academics
The academic program followed a classical liberal arts model with particular attention to classical (Latin and Greek) and modern foreign languages, British and American literature, mathematics and the natural sciences, history, theology, cultural studies, and the fine arts (vocal music, theater arts/communication, and mass media and video production). The Latin and Greek courses, in particular, encouraged all students to be able to read Virgil's Aeneid in the original Latin and be able to translate the Gospel of John from the original Greek by senior year. The mathematics program begins with pre-algebra and extends to Trigonometry and Calculus with emphasis in theory rather than application. Students were required to take Spanish as a modern foreign language. Each student was also required to participate in the school’s band and choir program. Students also participated in service to the community in order to graduate.

Spirituality
Religious services such as the Holy Mass, Rosary, and Benediction of the Blessed Sacrament were provided regularly for the students. Students were introduced to Catholic spirituality which takes different elements from various spiritual authors.

Athletics
Athletic activities were numerous and included basketball, soccer, hockey and baseball. Outdoor and recreational activities were also provided such as hiking expeditions in the White Mountains and seasonal opportunities for swimming, boating, skiing, and sledding.

External links
Catholic Diocese of Manchester
Missionaries of La Salette in Center Harbor
Pictures of the Missionaries of La Salette Novitiate in Center Harbor

References 

Catholic secondary schools in New Hampshire
Boarding schools in New Hampshire
Boys' schools in the United States
Schools in Belknap County, New Hampshire
Educational institutions established in 1982
Roman Catholic Diocese of Manchester
Catholic boarding schools in the United States
1982 establishments in New Hampshire
Center Harbor, New Hampshire